Greece competed at the 1912 Summer Olympics in Stockholm, Sweden. 22 competitors, all men, took part in 25 events in five sports. Greek athletes have competed in all Summer Olympic Games.

Medalists

Aquatics

Swimming

A single swimmer competed for Greece at the 1912 Games. It was the second time the nation appeared in swimming, and the first since the 1896 Summer Olympics.

Asimakopoulos placed third in the initial heats of his only event, the 100 metre freestyle, and did not advance to the quarterfinals.

Ranks given for each swimmer are within the heat.

 Men

Athletics

5 athletes represented Greece, including three who had competed in the 1908 Summer Olympics. All three had also represented Greece at the 1906 Intercalated Games. It was the fifth appearance of the nation in athletics, in which Greece had competed at each Olympics. Tsiklitiras, who had taken silver medals in both the standing jumps in 1908, again medalled in both with a gold and a bronze this time. Those two medals were the only ones Greece won in 1912 in any sport. Dorizas, the defending silver medalist in the freestyle javelin, suffered from the elimination of that event and did not medal in either of his throwing events. Banikas was the third returner.

Ranks given are within that athlete's heat for running events.

Fencing

Seven fencers represented Greece. It was the second appearance of the nation in fencing and the first since 1896. The Greek fencers did not advance to the finals in any event, falling only one place short of qualifying three times.

Shooting 

Nine shooters competed for Greece. It was the nation's third appearance in shooting. Greek shooters did not win any medals in 1912. Levidis came closest to winning a medal, shooting into a three-way tie for second place in the 300 metre military rifle. In the shoot-off, he finished last of the three to take an overall rank of fourth place.

Wrestling

Greco-Roman

Greece was represented by a single wrestler in its second Olympic wrestling appearance, its first since the 1896 Games in Athens. Antonopoulos lost his first two matches in the middleweight class and was eliminated at 26th place.

References

External links
Official Olympic Reports
International Olympic Committee results database

Nations at the 1912 Summer Olympics
1912
Olympics